Candida krusei is a budding yeast (a species of fungus) involved in chocolate production.  Candida krusei is an emerging fungal nosocomial pathogen primarily found in the immunocompromised and those with hematological malignancies.  It has natural resistance to fluconazole, a standard antifungal agent. It is most often found in patients who have had prior fluconazole exposure, sparking debate and conflicting evidence as to whether fluconazole should be used prophylactically.  Mortality due to C. krusei fungemia is much higher than the more common C. albicans.  Other Candida species that also fit this profile are C. parapsilosis, C. glabrata, C. tropicalis, C. guillermondii  and C. rugosa. Candida krusei is the anamorph name; the teleomorph name for the same organism is Pichia kudriavzevii. The International Commission on the Taxonomy of Fungi (ICTF) and the Nomenclature Committee for Fungi (NCF) have proposed revising the standard name to Pichia kudriavzevii in 2021.

Candida krusei can be successfully treated with voriconazole, amphotericin B, and echinocandins (micafungin, caspofungin, and anidulafungin).

Role in chocolate production
Cacao beans have to be fermented to remove the bitter taste and break them down. This takes place with two fungi: C. krusei and Geotrichum. Most of the time, the two fungi are already present on the seed pods and seeds of the cacao plant, but specific strains are used in modern chocolate making. Each chocolate company uses its own strains, which have been selected to provide optimum flavor and aroma to the chocolate.
The yeasts reproduce every few hours, and soon there are thousands of individual yeast cells in a small area, which produce enzymes to break down the pulp on the outside of the beans. This makes acetic acid, killing the cacao embryo inside the seed, developing a chocolatey aroma and eliminating the bitterness in the beans.

Growth and Metabolism
C. krusei grows at a maximum temperature of 43–45 °C. Although most of the medically important Candida spp. require biotin for growth and some have additional vitamin requirements, only C. krusei can grow in vitamin-free media. However, of the medically important Candida spp., C. krusei is perhaps the only species which grows on Sabouraud's dextrose agar as spreading colonies with a matte or a rough whitish-yellow surface, in contrast to the convex colonies of other Candida spp. This characteristic, together with its "long grain rice" appearance on microscopy, helps the definitive identification of the species. A complex variety of fatty acids has been demonstrated as metabolites when C. krusei is grown in culture media containing lactose, it is also able to produce a number of short-chain carboxylic acids when cultured in saliva supplemented with glucose; these include acetate, pyruvate, succinate, propionate, formate and lactate. The biological role of these, if any, is as yet unknown.

Of known pathogenic Candida species, Candida krusei has the lowest 90-day patient survival rate.

References

Further reading

External links 
 

krusei
Yeasts
Chocolate industry
Pathogenic microbes
Animal fungal diseases